Atalaya is the largest of four provinces in the Ucayali Region, in the central Amazon rainforest of Peru.

Languages

According to the 2007 census, Spanish was spoken as a first language by 49.1% of the population, while 37.0% spoke Asháninka, 1.7% spoke Quechua, 0.2% spoke Aymara, 11.9% spoke other indigenous languages and 0.1% spoke foreign languages.

Political division
The province is divided into four districts (singular: distrito), each of which is headed by a mayor (alcalde). The districts, with their capitals in parenthesis, are:

 Raymondi (Atalaya)
 Sepahua (Sepahua)
 Tahuania (Bolognesi)
 Yurua (Breu)

Places of interest 
 El Sira Communal Reserve
 Gran Pajonal

External links
  Municipalidad Provincial de Atalaya - Atalaya Province council official website

Provinces of the Ucayali Region